Charles Henry Davis (also known as Carl Henry Davis) (1865–1951) was an American businessman and civil engineer. He was the president and co-founder of the National Highways Association.  He founded the World Peace Movement.

Early life and education

Charles Henry Davis was born into a Quaker family. As a youth he lived in Philadelphia, Pennsylvania. As an adult he lived and worked in South Yarmouth, Massachusetts. He lived in the House of the Seven Chimneys. Davis was a yachtsman. He was married three times and fathered six children, all daughters. The House of Seven Chimneys was actually a group of houses and a barn artistically connected with a collective 217 windows and 17 front doors.

Career

Davis' grandfather, Edward Morris, and father, Henry Corbit Davis, were involved in road construction industry. They started the American Road Machine Company. Davis inherited the company and was president of it. He is responsible for building a United States' first "high-speed" tram. It ran from Washington, D.C. to Mount Vernon, Virginia. Davis also owned the Kentenia Mining Company in Kentucky.  He helped put Henry Ford into business by leasing his Kentucky mines to Ford to allow Ford to have a stable supply of coal to manufacture his automobiles.  Ford paid a fixed price for every railcar of coal plus a royalty on each vehicle he manufactured.

National Highway Association

Davis founded the National Highway Association (NHA) in 1911 with the motto "Good Roads Everywhere!" The organization focused on promoting national highways in the United States. NHA created pamphlets and maps of the highway system in the country, which totaled upwards of 50,000 miles worth of road. NHA developed concepts for connecting highway systems with their own team of engineers. The Jefferson Davis Memorial Highway and the Lone Star Road are two examples of proposed national highways that was never executed. The association was based in Washington, D.C. and had offices in New York City and Yarmouth. Coleman Dupont Donaldson was a member of the board.

Death and legacy

He died on June 2, 1951, in New York. Davis donated money to Columbia University in 1911 to fund the founding of a graduate program focused on highway engineering. He also founded Columbia's Davis Library of Highway Engineering. He donated $350,000 to create an engineering library at the University of Maryland in 1936. He funded the research of Alfred Adler. He was a fan of Winston Churchill. Davis raised $2 million to fund the creation of a statue of Churchill which would reside on the Dover Cliffs.  However, the people of England did not want this statue so it was never given.

References

1865 births
1951 deaths
Businesspeople from Philadelphia
People from Yarmouth, Massachusetts
Businesspeople from Massachusetts
American construction businesspeople